The men's synchronized 3 metre springboard diving competition at the 2015 European Games in Baku took place on 19 June at the Baku Aquatics Centre.

Results
The final was held at 19:00.

References

Men's 3 metre synchronized springboard